Gates Chili High School is a secondary school in the Gates Chili Central School District in Gates, New York. It opened in September 1958. The current principal of the school is Kenneth L. Hammel.

Gates Chili High School has a science wing, with an aquatics laboratory and botany study areas, an art and graphic arts wing for the study of classic art as well as technology applications for print and video, a 9,000 square foot library, a career and counseling center and a Field House with a 22,000 square foot gymnasium, fitness center, swimming pool and an indoor track .

Enrollment data 2014
Sex:
Male: 695
Female: 675

References

High schools in Monroe County, New York
Public high schools in New York (state)
Educational institutions established in 1958
1958 establishments in New York (state)